Vitali Valeryevich Botnar (born 19 May 2001) is a Russian football player of Moldovan origin. He plays for FC Torpedo Moscow.

Club career
He made his debut in the Russian Professional Football League for FC Kazanka Moscow on 6 September 2019 in a game against FC Dolgoprudny.

He made his debut in the Russian Football National League for FC Torpedo Moscow on 9 March 2020 in a game against FC Avangard Kursk. He played the full match.

Botnar made his Russian Premier League debut for FC Torpedo Moscow on 17 July 2022 against PFC Sochi.

Honours
Torpedo Moscow
 Russian Football National League : 2021-22

Career statistics

References

External links
 Profile by Russian Football National League
 
 
 

2001 births
Sportspeople from Bălți
Russian people of Moldovan descent
Living people
Russian footballers
Russia youth international footballers
Association football goalkeepers
FC Lokomotiv Moscow players
FC Torpedo Moscow players
Russian Second League players
Russian First League players
Russian Premier League players